Ross Harrison (born 3 September 1992 in Bolton, England) is a rugby union player for the Sale Sharks in the Aviva Premiership. He plays as a prop. He was called up to the England Saxons squad in January 2015 and made his 100th appearance for Sale Sharks against Harlequins on 6 November 2015.

Harrison was selected for the England squad to face the Barbarians in the summer of 2014 and toured South Africa with England Saxons in the summer of 2016.

In May 2017 he was invited to a training camp with the senior England squad by Eddie Jones.

References

1992 births
Living people
English rugby union players
Rugby union players from Bolton
Rugby union props
Sale Sharks players
Sedgley Park R.U.F.C. players